The Annual Review of Condensed Matter Physics is an annual peer-reviewed review journal published by Annual Reviews. It was established in 2010 and covers advances in condensed matter physics and related subjects. The co-editors are M. Cristina Marchetti and Andrew P. Mackenzie. As of 2022, Journal Citation Reports gives the journal  an impact factor of 23.978.

History
The Annual Review of Condensed Matter Physics was first published in 2010 by the nonprofit publisher Annual Reviews. Its founding editor was James S. Langer.  He was joined by James P. Eisenstein in 2014. M. Cristina Marchetti and Subir Sachdev were co-editors in 2016 and 2017; in 2018, Andrew P. Mackenzie joined as the third co-editor. As of 2021, the co-editors were Marchetti and Mackenzie. Though it was initially published in print, as of 2021 it is only published electronically.

Scope and indexing
The Annual Review of Condensed Matter Physics defines its scope as covering significant developments relevant to condensed matter physics. As of 2022, Journal Citation Reports lists the journal's impact factor of 23.978, ranking it fourth of 69 journal titles in the category "Physics, Condensed Matter". It is abstracted and indexed in Scopus, Science Citation Index Expanded, Compendex, and INSPEC.

Editorial processes
The Annual Review of Condensed Matter Physics is helmed by the editor or the co-editors. The editor is assisted by the editorial committee, which includes associate editors, regular members, and occasionally guest editors. Guest members participate at the invitation of the editor, and serve terms of one year. All other members of the editorial committee are appointed by the Annual Reviews board of directors and serve five-year terms. The editorial committee determines which topics should be included in each volume and solicits reviews from qualified authors. Unsolicited manuscripts are not accepted. Peer review of accepted manuscripts is undertaken by the editorial committee.

Current editorial board
As of 2022, the editorial committee consists of the two co-editors and the following members:

 Daniel F. Agterberg
 Emily S. C. Ching
 Eduardo H. Fradkin
 Yong Baek Kim
 Silvia Picozzi
 Leo Radzihovsky
 Kathleen J. Stebe
 Masahito Ueda
 Vincenzo Vitelli

See also
 List of physics journals

References 

 

Condensed Matter Physics
Annual journals
Condensed matter physics
Physics review journals
Publications established in 2010
English-language journals